is a Japanese tokusatsu drama and the 22nd entry in the Kamen Rider series written by Kazuki Nakashima. Transfer student Gentaro Kisaragi transforms into the titular hero Kamen Rider Fourze to battle the constellation-themed monsters called Zodiarts. Series' producer Hideaki Tsukuda initially planned on including various past Kamen Riders in the series to commemorate Kamen Riders 40th anniversary. However, due to past series Kamen Rider Decade celebrating the 10th anniversary of the Heisei Kamen Riders, Kamen Rider Fourze appreciates the previous Kamen Riders' history and treats them as urban legends in-universe.

Additionally, the monstrous Horoscopes seek to transform Amanogawa High's students and faculty into more of their kind to expand their ranks.

Main characters

Kamen Rider Club
The  is a club that Gentaro Kisaragi forms to gain new friends at AGHS, using past Kamen Riders as inspiration. After Gentaro becomes Kamen Rider Fourze, the club's members assist him in his battles against the Zodiarts and investigate the urban legends that surround the past Kamen Riders' existence. After losing the Rabbit Hatch to the Zodiarts in the series finale, the Kamen Rider Club is reworked to become the Earth-based .

Gentaro Kisaragi
 is a second-year, later third-year, student at AGHS with a reckless, bad-boy image due to his delinquent yankee fashion sense coupled with a sociable attitude and a desire to befriend everyone he comes across. Throughout his time at AGHS, he goes on to become Kamen Rider Fourze and form the Kamen Rider Club.

Five years later, as of the events of the crossover film Kamen Rider × Kamen Rider Wizard & Fourze: Movie War Ultimatum, Kisaragi has become an AGHS teacher and the Kamen Rider Club's new academic advisor before sacrificing his Rider powers to help his student, Saburo Kazeta defeat Kageto Banba.

The Fourze System consists of a spacesuit, the  belt, and 40 , all of which harness Cosmic Energy and were reverse-engineered from the Presenters' Core Switch by Rokuro Utahoshi, who was inspired by the Four Symbols and a hypothetical friendship-based system used by Kyoto's citizens' ancestors. As such, Kisaragi is the only one who can access the Fourze System's full potential. Additionally, Mitsuaki Gamou compares Fourze's power to that of a gravitational lens due to Kisaragi's influence on Astroswitches and Zodiarts Switches.

With the Fourze Driver and four Astroswitches, Kisaragi can transform into the white-colored Kamen Rider Fourze . Due to the power that certain Astroswitches possess, they can allow Kisaragi to access additional forms, which are as follows:

 : A gold-colored auxiliary form accessed from the  Switch that grants electrokinesis and arms Fourze with the  baton.

Additionally, Kisaragi possesses additional forms accessed from unique Astroswitches that appear in supplemental media connected to the series.

 : An orange-colored form accessed from the  that equips Fourze with a pair of Rocket Modules. This form first appears in the crossover film Kamen Rider × Kamen Rider Fourze & OOO: Movie War Mega Max.
 : An orange-colored form accessed from the  Switch that equips Fourze with the  Module. This form appears exclusively in the Hyper Battle DVD special Kamen Rider Fourze Hyper Battle DVD: Rocket Drill States of Friendship.
This form appears exclusively in the film Kamen Rider Fourze the Movie: Space, Here We Come!
 : A purple-colored form accessed from the Fusion, Meteor, and Nadeshiko Switches that equips Fourze with a pair of Rocket Modules and the  skis for gliding purposes. This form appears exclusively in the film Kamen Rider × Kamen Rider Wizard & Fourze: Movie War Ultimatum.
 : A blue-colored form accessed from the  that equips Fourze with four  Modules, which are all capable of firing salvos of highly explosive missiles. This form appears exclusively in the tie-in novel Kamen Rider Fourze: Ama High Grad-Uation.

Kengo Utahoshi
After losing Rokuro the day he was born and a year before the series, Kengo discovered the Fourze System, Rabbit Hatch, and the Zodiarts' existence and took on his father's mission to fight the monsters. Due to his weak physical constitution however, which he believed was a medical condition, Kengo is unable to properly utilize Rokuro's equipment and is forced to let Kisaragi take his place while he serves as a tactician. Due to his desire to uphold his father's legacy, Kengo initially refuses to acknowledge the Kamen Rider Club, though he eventually warms up to them and Kisaragi.

During his third year at AGHS, Kengo discovers the truth of Rokuro's death and realizes his nature as the Core Child. He uses his powers to foil Mitsuaki Gamou's plans to see the Presenters by destroying AGHS before intending to leave Earth and return to the Presenters himself with what he has learned about humanity. However, a vengeful Gamou destroys the Core Switch, causing the youth's body to dissolve into light particles. Following his final battle with Kisaragi, Gamou revives Kengo as a human, leading to the latter staying on Earth with his friends.

Five years later, as of the events of the film Kamen Rider × Kamen Rider Wizard & Fourze: Movie War Ultimatum, Kengo became a scientist working to continue Utahoshi and Gamou's dream of seeing the Presenters.

Yuki Jojima
 is a bright and cheerful second-year, later third-year, student and Kisaragi's childhood friend who cares deeply for her friends. After hearing a voice from the stars as a child, she became obsessed with becoming an astronaut and went on to become a self-proclaimed "space otaku" in the present. After meeting Kengo on the day he found the Rabbit Hatch, Jojima supports him in his endeavors and convinces him to let Kisaragi join them, becoming the founding members of the Kamen Rider Club in the process. During her third year, Yuki becomes the Kamen Rider Club's new president after Miu graduates, using her ingenuity to lead her friends in their battles against the Zodiarts.

Five years later, as of the events of the film Kamen Rider × Kamen Rider Wizard & Fourze: Movie War Ultimatum, Jojima fulfilled her dream of becoming an astronaut.

Miu Kazashiro
 is a level-headed yet cocky third-year, later undergraduate, student who comes from an upper-class family, head cheerleader of AGHS, and  two years running, a title she earned in the  through effort and hard work. Among her philosophies as queen, she believes that she needs to know everything that occurs within the campus grounds and that one can only truly shine under their own power. Though she is well-loved by many at school, she displays a superiority complex over her classmates and sees those who are infatuated with her as sycophants who leech onto her for their own failure to shine. This mentality initially leads to her clashing with Kisaragi. When her fellow cheerleader Tamae Sakuma humiliates her and reveals the negative aspects of her personality in front of their classmates in an attempt become the new queen however, a humbled Kazashiro is reminded of her passion and returns to compete in the Festival despite the odds being against her. After winning a third time, she accepts Kisaragi's friendship and joins the Kamen Rider Club, using her natural leadership skills to become its president and working with Kengo to coordinate group efforts. Over time, she becomes more caring of others and willing to step in herself if necessary. Following her graduation, Kazashiro names Yuki the new president while the former becomes the club's chairwoman as her chosen college is close to AGHS.

Five years later, as of the events of Kamen Rider × Kamen Rider Wizard & Fourze: Movie War Ultimatum, Kazashiro has become a successful model.

JK
In his youth, he dreamed of becoming a rock star like his father, Keizo, and formed a rock band with his friend Tojiro Goto, only to give up the dream upon realizing he cannot sing. After learning of Gentaro Kisaragi's identity as Kamen Rider Fourze, JK agrees to keep the former's secret in exchange for protection from Fumihiro Nitta, a student the latter had wronged, while secretly intending to steal one of Kisaragi's Astroswitches in an attempt to teach him a lesson about trust. However, JK is captured by Nitta, rescued by Kisaragi, and learns the true meaning of friendship before joining the Kamen Rider Club, using his connections to aid the group in identifying Switchers, Zodiarts, and their targets.

Following Miu Kazashiro and Shun Daimonji's graduation, JK becomes the Powerdizer's secondary pilot and sets up an internet radio show called DJ Gene Milky Night Carnival under the alias "DJ Gene" as a means of living out his childhood dream. When Goto returns as a Zodiarts and uses his powers to increase the show's popularity, JK finds himself conflicted by his loyalties to the Kamen Rider Club and refusal to give up on his dreams like his father had. Upon discovering Goto was brainwashing people, JK ends DJ Gene Milky Night Carnival in favor of cherishing his friendships.

Five years later, as of the events of the crossover film Kamen Rider × Kamen Rider Wizard & Fourze: Movie War Ultimatum, JK has become a journalist.

Shun Daimonji
 is a third-year, later undergraduate, student, a stereotypical jock, and captain of the American football team who is treated like a king by the student body. Due to his life being planned out by his father, Takato, Shun was raised to believe that those beneath him are trash and that he should manipulate them to suit his needs. Additionally, he distances himself from anything that could potentially ruin his reputation for fear of shaming his father and their family name and paired himself up with Miu Kazashiro, the "queen" of AGHS. After a series of events lead to him receiving detention with Gentaro Kisaragi and the Kamen Rider Club, Shun reveals his history to them, how he is not truly happy with who he is or what he achieved, and that he considers himself an outcast due to his holier-than-thou attitude. Respecting his wishes, Kisaragi inspires Shun to do what he truly wants while making his father happy, which subsequently leads to the latter joining the Kamen Rider Club as Kisaragi's ally in combat via the Powerdizer. Over time, Shun slowly becomes more humble and friendly, though he experiences discomfort and guilt in response to others following his previous example and works to atone for his past misdeeds.

Five years later, as of the events of the film Kamen Rider × Kamen Rider Wizard & Fourze: Movie War Ultimatum, Daimonji has become a professional American football player and rekindled his relationship with Kazashiro.

Tomoko Nozama
 is a spiritual first-year, later second-year, goth girl with an unorthodox sense of thinking, an acute sixth sense, and uncanny stealth. After joining other goth students in forming a coven while in pursuit of her dream of living on the moon, only to learn they are fake, she nearly becomes a Zodiarts until Gentaro Kisaragi brings her to the moon via the Rabbit Hatch. Despite being disappointed by the coldness of space, Nozama finds comfort and acceptance in the Kamen Rider Club, joining them and providing assistance with her ability to detect things others overlook.

Five years later, as of the events of the film Kamen Rider × Kamen Rider Wizard & Fourze: Movie War Ultimatum, Nozama has become a best-selling novelist.

Ryusei Sakuta

Due to his search taking him to AGHS, Sakuta puts on a timid demeanor to infiltrate the Kamen Rider Club and secretly report on their activities for Tachibana while assuming his true aggressive nature as Meteor. Despite helping the Kamen Rider Club develop new technology for Fourze, Sakuta is manipulated by Aries into nearly killing Fourze in exchange for Aries reviving Iseki. While Sakuta's identity is exposed in the process and Aries upholds his promise, Iseki's worsening condition causes Sakuta to risk his life protecting the Kamen Rider Club, who forgive him and agree to keep his identity secret. Following the Zodiarts' defeat, Sakuta returns to Subaruboshi High.

Five years later, as of the events of the film Kamen Rider × Kamen Rider Wizard & Fourze: Movie War Ultimatum, Sakuta became an Interpol agent alongside Inga Blink.

On his own, Sakuta is a proficient martial artist and practitioner of Jeet Kune Do and the fictional .

Additionally, he possesses the  brace, which grants abilities based on Mars, Jupiter, and Saturn as well as allow him to perform the  Limit Break.

Recurring characters

Rokuro Utahoshi
 is Kengo's father who worked for the OSTO at their lunar base, which would later become the Rabbit Hatch. While studying Cosmic Energy with Mitsuaki Gamou and Kuniteru Emoto, Utahoshi reverse-engineered the Fourze System from the Core Switch in the hopes that the finalized versions would be made for future generations after his death. Seventeen years before the series, Gamou tasked Emoto with getting the Zodiarts Switches from the OSTO lunar base to Earth. In the process, the latter abandoned Rokuro on the moon. Before he died, Rokuro left an inscription explaining the legacy he meant to leave behind with the Fourze System.

Chuta Ohsugi
 is a middle-aged, superstitious, and cowardly second year geography teacher, later third-year homeroom teacher, with a habit of punctuating his sentences by snapping his suspenders, which he always wears. Despite being disliked by several AGHS students and his belief that teachers should not be friends with them, he also believes that teachers should protect their students.

After becoming the Kamen Rider Club's homeroom teacher, Ohsugi makes it his mission to catch them committing misdeeds. This would lead to him discovering the Rabbit Hatch and their battle against the Zodiarts. In spite of their pleas, he intends to disband the club for varying reasons until he learns his fellow faculty members are involved in Zodiarts attacks and the Kamen Rider Club save him from one such monster. Following these, he agrees to give the club faculty approval, reconciles with them, and becomes their academic adviser. By the end of the series, his respect for the group and bravery have grown to the point where he is willing to put himself in danger to stop the Leo Zodiarts from harming the Kamen Rider Club.

Zodiarts
If they use their Switch often enough, the Switch will gather energy until it transforms into its "Last One" phase. If the Switcher uses it at this point, their mind will be transferred from their human body to their Zodiarts form, which can potentially evolve into one of the  if they unlock their  and absorb their human body.

Gamou created the Zodiarts and Horoscopes to withstand the rigors of transwarp travel and generate negative Cosmic Energy to convert an atmospheric vortex above AGHS known as  into an extra-dimensional labyrinth called the  so he can reach the Presenters. After learning the Dark Nebula would also destroy AGHS and the city, the Kamen Rider Club eventually succeed in stopping Gamou.

Mitsuaki Gamou
Despite his charming personality, he lacks friends as he views the concept as beneath him. As a child, Gamou heard the Presenters' call around the time of the Apollo 11 exploration, motivating him to join NASA, the Russian Federal Space Agency, and the OSTO in an attempt to meet them. Twenty years prior to the series, while working for OSTO, Gamou found the Presenters' Core Switch alongside Rokuro Utahoshi on the moon. The pair cracked the Switch's puzzle, but clashed over how to contact the Presenters, with Gamou seeing Rokuro's Fourze System as a time-consuming dead end before he went on to develop the Zodiarts Switches. Three years after finding the Core Switch, Gamou tasked Kuniteru Emoto with getting the Zodiarts Switches from OSTO's lunar station and murdering Rokuro, though Emoto abandoned Rokuro on the moon instead.

Throughout the first half of the series, Gamou secretly uses AGHS to encourage the students to pursue individuality and whatever they please in the hopes that they can evolve and become Horoscopes. Additionally, he orders his subordinates not to eliminate Kamen Riders Fourze and Meteor as they provide an additional factor towards his Zodiarts' evolution. After Emoto reveals his true colors and aids the Riders however, Gamou reveals himself to the pair and searches for the Core Switch. When Utahoshi's son Kengo thwarts his Day of Awakening, Gamou destroys the Core Switch to kill Kengo before renewing his plans, only for Fourze to defeat him. Gamou accepts the Rider's ideals and friendship, but begins to evaporate into stardust due to years of working directly with Cosmic Energy. Before he dies, he asks the Kamen Rider Club to meet the Presenters in his stead before using the Aquarius Zodiarts' powers to repair the Core Switch and resurrect Kengo.

Due to years of saturating himself with high levels of negative Cosmic Energy, Gamou gained supernatural abilities in his human form, such as the ability to grant his fellow Horoscopes their Supernova powers and place hypnotic suggestions in people. As the Sagittarius Zodiarts, Gamou possesses durable armor and can generate the  bow on his left arm, which can fire a barrage of Cosmic Energy arrows. His Supernova ability allows him to transform into , gaining increased agility, the ability to fire arrows directly from his left hand without Gilgamesh, and augment his attacks with negative Cosmic Energy. Similarly to Kou Tatsugami, Gamou can also utilize other Horoscope Switches.

Sarina Sonoda
 is the youthful and beautiful AGHS homeroom teacher of class 2-B who teaches classical literature and serves as Mitsuaki Gamou's loyal right hand after Principal Hayami recruited her while she was an AGHS student. After being defeated by Fourze and Meteor despite attaining her Supernova powers and maintaining her secret identity however, Kuniteru Emoto seemingly banishes Sonoda to the Dark Nebula for her failure while Gamou acquires her Horoscope Switch and covers up her disappearance as a sabbatical, later resignation, due to health reasons. It is later revealed that she was placed in suspended animation on the M-BUS.

As of the tie-in novel Kamen Rider Fourze: Ama High Grad-Uation, Sonoda is safely returned to Earth, where the Kamen Rider Club discover her connection to the Zodiarts. Additionally, it is also revealed that she had a childhood friend, Tsubasa Amano, who was killed in an accident following an argument they had. As a result, she blamed herself for it and developed a split personality based on him. While she was able to suppress it, the personality influenced her actions as the Scorpion Zodiarts and inspired Tsubasa, an alien that took on Sonoda's appearance and split personality. After Fourze defeats Tsubasa and the Kamen Rider Club help her come to terms with the latter, Sonoda surrenders herself to the police and is allowed to return to AGHS once she completes her sentence.

As the Scorpion Zodiarts, Sonoda utilizes a kick-based fighting style and possesses claw-like gauntlets, a scorpion's tail-like ponytail that doubles as a whip, and the ability to envenom targets. Her Supernova ability allows her to transform into , gaining a scorpion man-like form that grants monstrous strength and the ability to store enough energy to destroy a city.

Kouhei Hayami
 is the attractive and charming yet shrewd and inquisitive principal of AGHS who most everyone falls for and displays undying loyalty to Mitsuaki Gamou. Following Sonoda's banishment, Gamou tasks Hayami with continuing her task of distributing Zodiarts Switches and accelerate their efforts to find the remaining Horoscopes, which the latter reluctantly agrees to by targeting his prized pupils while staying out of combat as much as possible.

After negating a version of "The Hole" over Kyoto to ensure only "The Hole" over AGHS can gather Cosmic Energy, Hayami learns Gamou intends to eliminate him now that his usefulness has ended. Due to this new development, Gamou allows Hayami to stay until the Horoscopes have been found. However, Hayami slowly begins to question Gamou's goals and his place in it and considers betraying him. Nevertheless, Hayami ultimately chooses to remain by Gamou's side and takes a kill shot from Kamen Rider Fourze meant for Gamou. Before he is vaporized by "The Hole's" lightning, Hayami dies satisfied with his actions.

As the Libra Zodiarts, Hayami wields the  khakkhara, which can cast illusions. As stated above, his Supernova ability allows him to identify Horoscopes, current and future.

Kuniteru Emoto
 is an associate of Mitsuaki Gamou and Rokuro Utahoshi who worked as a research associate and studied Cosmic Energy with them at OSTO twenty years prior to the series. Out of jealousy towards Rokuro, who Emoto saw as the Earth to Gamou's sun and his moon, reflecting the sun's light while paling in comparison to them, Emoto formed a partnership with Gamou, stole the Zodiarts Switches from OSTO for him, and abandoned Utahoshi on the moon. However, Emoto came to regret his actions and vowed to take Rokuro's place as the Earth in their relationship to Gamou by subverting the latter's agenda.

After Gamou orders Kouhei Hayami to negate The Hole in Kyoto, Emoto transfers to Miraikan to become the Kamen Rider Club's instructor and use his Tachibana identity to train Fourze in using ruthlessness instead of friendship to get what he wants. When Tomoko Nozama discovers his identity, Emoto sends her to the M-BUS to conceal his secret before intimidating the other Kamen Rider Club members into leaving Fourze. However, Kengo's ingenuity and Hayami's powers lead to Emoto's secrets being revealed to the Zodiarts and Kamen Rider Club. Upon seeing Fourze's friends stand by him despite what he did, Emoto befriends Fourze and brings Nozama back, but is mortally wounded by Gamou and killed by Kou Tatsugami for his betrayal. Before he dies, Emoto reveals the truth of what happened to Utahoshi to Kengo, begs him to stop Gamou, and leaves behind a flash drive for Kengo detailing his history and Gamou's Day of Awakening.

As of the tie-in novel Kamen Rider Fourze: Ama High Grad-Uation, Fourze safely returns everyone that Emoto sent to the M-BUS to Earth.

As the Virgo Zodiarts, Emoto wields the  halberd, can produce formidable barriers, fire black hole-like orbs, and conjure portals to send targets to other locations.

Kou Tatsugami
 is a skilled martial artist who originally took part in street fights as he had little to live for until he met and was bested by Mitsuaki Gamou, after which the former became fanatically loyal to him, serving as his personal aide and bodyguard.

On his own, Tatsugami is an adept hand-to-hand combatant. As the Leo Zodiarts, Tatsugami possesses clawed gauntlets, a roar-based shockwave attack, superhuman speed, incredible durability, and the ability to produce personal kabuki-themed versions of the Dustards called , which wield twin Duswords. Like Gamou, Tatsugami also possesses a unique physiology that allows him to use the other Horoscopes' Switches. 

Natsuji Kijima
 is an arrogant second-year student with a sharp tongue who displays hostility towards anyone who irritates him. Using his Zodiarts form and partially for fun, Kijima seeks revenge on teacher Haruka Utsugi for taking his rakugo fan by attacking martial artists and mimicking her fighting style to frame her as the Pegasus Zodiarts.

Quickly winning Mitsuaki Gamou's favor, Kijima tactlessly flaunts his increased power, challenges Kamen Riders Fourze and Meteor constantly, and belittles Hayami for not treating him as an equal. After learning Meteor's identity, Kijima tortures the Rider in increasingly twisted ways and quickly gains his Supernova abilities. However, Meteor acquires new powers of his own and defeats Kijima. The latter goes to Hayami for help, but the principal uses his illusionary powers to disguise Kijima as a meddling detective and convince Emoto to send him to the Dark Nebula. Taking possession of Kijima's Horoscope Switch for Gamou, Hayami later claims Kijima died in battle while Kijima himself was secretly placed in suspended animation within the M-BUS.

As of the tie-in novel Kamen Rider Fourze: Ama High Grad-Uation, Kijima is safely returned to Earth.

As the Pegasus Zodiarts, Kijima possesses increased offensive capabilities and the ability to generate horseshoe-shaped energy blasts. As the Cancer Zodiarts, he possesses an impregnable carapace capable of withstanding most Limit Breaks, sharp pincers on his left forearm capable of slicing any material, the ability to liquefy himself, and the ability to remove people's life forces and place them in comas. His Supernova ability allows him to transform into , taking on a more monstrous form that possesses incredible strength, an even more impregnable carapace, and the ability to store enough energy to destroy a city.

Ran Kuroki
 is a first-year student at AGHS who is proficient in swimming and aikido. Though Gentaro Kisaragi tries to befriend her and her best friend Haru Kusao, she rejects his friendship outright due to an incident with senior students from her old middle school that convinced her to not trust students older than her and to protect Kusao. However, her ideals lead to Kusao becoming a Zodiarts because he felt she was smothering him. After receiving help from Kisaragi in bringing Kusao back to his senses, Kuroki apologizes to everyone involved and becomes a provisional member of the Kamen Rider Club until Kusao fully recovers.

Despite her Switch temporarily turning an immature blue instead of the Horoscopes' usual red, Tatsugami's plan eventually works and he steals the complete Pisces Switch from Kuroki, who is temporarily hospitalized following an attempt to fight Tatsugami without her powers. As of the series finale, Kuroki and Kusao become full members of the Kamen Rider Club.

As the Pisces Zodiarts, Kuroki can liquefy herself, swim through solid surfaces, and shoot high pressure water streams. Additionally, a clone of the Zodiarts seen in the film Kamen Rider Fourze the Movie: Space, Here We Come! wields an unnamed, double-headed trident-like weapon.

Minor Zodiarts
: A third year AGHS student and member of the cheerleading squad. However, Fourze defeats Sakuma while Kazashiro wins the festival once more. Following this, Sakuma makes minor reappearances throughout the series.
: A first-year AGHS student and member of the school's fencing team. He seeks revenge against JK for using him as a human shield against bullies, only to be defeated by Kamen Rider Fourze.
: A first-year AGHS student and the rebellious son of detention teacher Takashi Satake who despite getting good grades, adopts delinquent hobbies and mannerisms due to being unhappy with his life. He goes on a rampage, or "hunting" as he calls it, with support from Sonoda until he is defeated by Kamen Rider Fourze and Shun Daimonji in the Powerdizer.
Creating moon pendants for her followers, Usaka channels her powers through them to make it appear as if they are witches until Kengo Utahoshi exposes the deception. In retaliation, Usaka attempts to burn the school down, but Shun Daimonji destroys her staff before Kamen Rider Fourze defeats her. Following this, Usaka makes minor reappearances throughout the series.
: The president of the AGHS astronomy club with an obsessive crush on Yuki Jojima. Growing jealous of her spending time with Gentaro Kisaragi and the Kamen Rider Club instead of him, Makise receives a Zodiarts Switch and transforms into the stag beetle-like , gaining dowsing rod-like arm blades that allow him to locate whatever he wishes and redirect oncoming objects at whatever he is pointing at. After losing all infatuation with Jojima, he attempts to seek revenge on all of the girls who rejected him instead, only to be defeated by Kamen Rider Fourze. In the tie-in novel Kamen Rider Fourze: Ama High Grad-Uation, Tsubasa turns Makise back into the Pyxis Zodiarts before making him a component of the Argo Zodiarts.
: The hyper-critical president of the AGHS art club who desires to create the perfect art piece. Motoyama uses his powers to attack anyone and anything he believes interferes with his work until Kamen Rider Fourze makes him realize the error of his ways. As Motoyama had unlocked his Resurrection Star, Hayami brainwashes him in an attempt to turn him into a Horoscope, but Fourze defeats Motoyama.
: An AGHS student and Kengo's self-proclaimed academic rival who displays a willingness to attack anyone with better scores and grades than him. He terrorizes AGHS until he is defeated by Kamen Rider Fourze.
: An intimidating third year AGHS student and the captain of the school's track and field team who refuses to let his team receive outside help. He attacks members of his team for not following his rules and attempts to kill the Kamen Riders after Hayami orders him to until Kamen Rider Fourze defeats Nomoto.
: An AGHS student and cosplay otaku who wants to be a hero like Kamen Rider Fourze, but lacks the nerve to do so. Cygnus attempts to replace Fourze as a hero and displace Eguchi, who possesses no memory of being Cygnus, until Kamen Rider Meteor destroys the Zodiarts.
: A third year AGHS student and president of the school's newspaper with an intense desire to find the truth. After discovering the identities of three previous Switchers, Tokuda uses her powers to recreate their Zodiarts forms and increase the newspaper's popularity out of a desire to delay her graduation from AGHS. She later receives help from Kijima in attacking the prom, only to be defeated by Kamen Rider Fourze and Shun Daimonji in the Powerdizer.
While transformed, he wields the  scepter and possesses an aura that can manipulate a person's bodily functions. His Supernova ability that allows him to transform into , which grants a sleeker body and the ability to fire energy spheres. Having developed a god complex, Yamada quickly came to disregard Mitsuaki Gamou's goals and stopped attending meetings with his fellow Horoscopes. When Kamen Rider Meteor comes to him for help in reviving Jiro Iseki, Yamada obliges in exchange for Meteor killing Fourze and the Kamen Rider Club. Ultimately however, Meteor chooses to join Fourze in fighting Yamada, who ends up in a coma following his defeat while his Horoscope Switch falls into Gamou's possession.
 : A recent transfer student at AGHS, friend of JK's from junior high school, and an aspiring rock star with terrible guitar playing skills under the stage name "God". While transformed, he wields the  electric guitar, which can manipulate sound, generate devastating sonic waves, and entrance and trap people within a Cosmic Energy manifestation of the musical staff, with the entranced people going on a "high" for a period of time before suffering an adrenaline crash that can last for days. Upon learning of the youth's ability to resonate with certain Switches, Kou Tatsugami hypothesizes Goto can locate the Core Switch for Gamou, who bestows Goto his Supernova powers to increase the Horoscopes' chances of success. Wishing to fulfill his dream of becoming a rock star, Goto reunites with JK in the hopes of reworking their old band into Gene God Dark Night Carnival, using his powers to improve their musical skills while secretly brainwashing listeners into crazed fans. However, Fourze gets through to JK via one of the latter's father's songs and breaks Goto's spell with his own terrible guitar playing skills. Fourze subsequently defeats Goto before the latter can use his Supernova ability, but Gamou has Goto spirited away to confiscate his Horoscope Switch before erasing his memory since the youth had confirmed the Core Switch is still active.
 : An elitist American transfer student who came to AGHS to pursue her dream of becoming an astronaut like her father prior to his retirement. While transformed, she wields the  whip and vase-like pauldrons that can be used to heal herself and others unless they are shattered simultaneously. Despite befriending Jojima and becoming distressed by the fact that Kisaragi is Kamen Rider Fourze, whom she is tasked with eliminating, Suda's respect for and dedication towards Gamou leads to her facing Fourze in a duel under the belief that one of them must fall. Suda is defeated, but Gamou has her spirited away in order to erase her memory of being a Horoscope and claim her Horoscope Switch. Following this, Suda effectively befriends Kisaragi and Jojima anew.
 : A third year AGHS student and interim student body president. He initially held steadfastly onto the school's policies towards student individuality and bickered with his predecessor, Sayaka Mibu, over idealistic differences. Following her being hospitalized and him gaining the means to transform into the  however, a panicked Sugiura uses his newly acquired position and  scepter, which allows him to force people into keeping a contracted promise and turn people into loyal drones by removing their souls, to create and enforce the Amanogawa Campus Bylaws to drastically limit his classmates' individuality and effectively bring AGHS under his control, using his feelings for Mibu to justify his actions. However, Fourze brings Mibu to see what Sugiura has done and convince him to stop by breaking his rules. Unable to bring himself to punish her, Sugiura breaks down and fights Kuniteru Emoto when he arrives to remind him of his place with the Horoscopes, only to be seemingly sent to the Dark Nebula and secretly placed in suspended animation within the M-BUS while his Horoscope Switch comes into Gamou's possession. As of the tie-in novel Kamen Rider Fourze: Ama High Grad-Uation, Sugiura is safely returned to Earth.
 : A doppelgänger of Yuki Jojima who was created when Kouhei Hayami and Kou Tatsugami forced her to activate a Zodiarts Switch. Unlike other Zodiarts, the negative aspects of Jojima's personality split off into a separate physical form completely identical to hers, save for a mask with a blank expression where her face would be. While transformed, Dark Yuki possesses an unorthodox fighting style and wields red  cards that explode on contact and blue  cards that explode on her command. Her Supernova ability allows her to produce a clone of herself that doubles as a living explosive. Dark Yuki nearly succeeds until Kisaragi reminds Jojima of a strong memory from their childhood to reverse the process, destroying Dark Yuki while Tatsugami retrieves the Gemini Switch for Gamou.

Other Zodiarts
 : A giant, non-humanoid Zodiarts that Tsubasa created from the Pyxis, Carina, Puppis, and Vela Zodiarts capable of summoning pirate-themed Dustards. The Argo Zodiarts appears exclusively in the tie-in novel Kamen Rider Fourze: Ama High Grad-Uation.
Ryoko Sakamoto, Sumie Taira, and Seiru Hozumi all appear exclusively in the tie-in novel Kamen Rider Fourze: Ama High Grad-Uation.

Toshiya Miura
 is a second-year AGHS student and a member of the American football team. Despite this, Miura became addicted to the power of Zodiarts Switches and became a shut-in. Months later, Fourze, the Kamen Rider Club, and Miura's girlfriend Mari Yamamoto of the AGHS photography club investigate and learn of what happened to him and attempt to bring him back to school. When the Scorpion Zodiarts offers to turn him back into the Orion Zodiarts, Miura recalls his old self and resists the temptation before befriending Fourze and returning to AGHS as a member of the photography club to be with Yamamoto.

As the Orion Zodiarts, Miura possesses superhuman strength and endurance and wields the  club and  shield. 

Takashi Satake
Additionally, Takashi displays an extreme intolerance for delinquents, likening to them to dirt spots on a clean surface. After Fourze rescues his son Teruhiko however, Takashi has a change of heart and eventually goes on to become the new principal following Kouhei Hayami's death.

Jiro Iseki
 is one of Ryusei Sakuta's friends from Subaruboshi High School who acquired a malfunctioning Zodiarts Switch through unknown means in an attempt to become stronger than Sakuta, only for the Switch to put him into a coma. Due to the Switch remaining on and Iseki being the only one capable of turning it off, he is unable to be treated by conventional medicine. As a result, Sakuta became Kamen Rider Meteor and attempts to locate the Aries Zodiarts to save him. While Sakuta eventually succeeds in reviving Iseki, who deactivates his Switch, the latter is horrified to learn what the former did to save him, loses his will to live, and relapses. After helping Fourze defeat Aries, Sakuta makes amends with Iseki and helps him recover.

Haru Kusao
As his Zodiarts form evolves however, Kusao becomes addicted to the Switch's power and his mental state grows increasingly unstable until Fourze restrains him long enough for Kuroki to apologize for being overprotective of him. After Kusao asks Fourze to defeat him, he is temporarily hospitalized and given provisional, later full, membership with the Kamen Rider Club alongside Kuroki.

As the Musca Zodiarts, Kusao initially has the ability to emit slime from his mouth and possesses increased jumping capabilities. As he evolves, he gains armor, increased strength, the ability to separate into a swarm of flies, wings, and the ability to emit explosive slime balls.

Guest characters
: A second year AGHS student and member of the cheerleading squad who comes off as an airhead with a hearty appetite. After Miu Kazashiro leaves the cheerleading squad to join the Kamen Rider Club, she leaves Shigeno in charge. Over the course of the series, Shigeno slowly improves the squad, to Kazashiro's delight.
: A third year AGHS student and the leader of a group of delinquents who hang out behind the school.
: A first year student that Gentaro Kisaragi tries to convince to enter the Queen Festival to unseat Miu Kazashiro from her yearly winning streak, only for an attack by the Chameleon Zodiarts to scare Hirota into backing out. Hirota later becomes Shun Daimonji's girlfriend after Kazashiro dumps him, only to dump him in turn after seeing him in detention. Months later, Hirota is among the girls that Hiroki Makise kidnaps before Daimonji rescues them.
: Shun's father who planned out his son's life for him.
: An AGHS student, a member of the school's photography club, and Toshiya Miura's girlfriend.
: A second year AGHS student and president of the school's glee club.
: An overweight first-year AGHS student and a member of the school's glee club.
: A student in Gentaro Kisaragi, Yuki Jojima, and Kengo Utahoshi's homeroom class and a member of the school's glee club.
: A second year AGHS student and a member of the school's track and field club with an inferiority complex regarding her above average height and size for girls.
: A skilled kickboxer and Sarina Sonoda's replacement as AGHS's class 2-B's homeroom teacher who took up teaching out of fear of being unable to making a living out of kickboxing, though she openly desires to quit her current job. After taking Natsuji Kijima's rakugo fan, he seeks revenge by turning into a Zodiarts, attacking martial artists, and framing Utsugi. However, Fourze and the Kamen Rider Club discover the truth and inspire Utsugi to stay true to her life path and suggest she balance everything out instead. After helping Fourze defeat Kijima, Utsugi chooses to stay on at AGHS and form a kickboxing club. As of the crossover film Kamen Rider × Kamen Rider Wizard & Fourze: Movie War Ultimatum, Utsugi has become a champion kickboxer.
As the head of the Society, she grades people in a way similar to how Cygnus believes people are worthy of his presence. Being faithful to the Zodiarts, Toriizaki attempts to force Norio Eguchi to transform into Cygnus, only to learn the Zodiarts' true colors and disband the Ugly Duckling Society.
: Gentaro's grandfather who looked after him since his parents died in an accident and owns a local motorcycle shop called .
: A third year AGHS student in Kisaragi, Jojima, Kengo, and Ryusei Sakuta's homeroom class. Upon discovering Kisaragi is Kamen Rider Fourze, Takamura takes pity on him, believing his heroic life is taking away from his regular life, and goes to extreme lengths to make him quit. Eventually, Kisaragi and Jojima convince Takamura to give up her quest and help her understand why he helps people.
: A third-year AGHS student and the school's student council president who clashes with Yuta Sugiura over a variety of matters concerning the student body, such as students abusing the school's policies regarding individuality and freedom, with her wanting to keep them in check. After being hospitalized by a group of delinquents, Sugiura takes her place and takes drastic measures to implement Mibu's wishes. Upon learning what he did, Mibu returns to school and convinces him to stop.
: The head of the student council's decency committee who has feelings for Sugiura despite knowing he has feelings for Mibu. When Sugiura takes Mibu's place and establishes the Amanogawa Campus Bylaws, Oki faithfully follows his lead in the hopes he will notice her. However, he attempts to punish her after she fails to capture Tomoko Nozama, leading to Oki telling Kisaragi to tell Mibu of what Sugiura has done.
: JK's father and fisherman who used to be a popular rock star.
Yuki's parents: Yuki's eccentric mother and father who are in love with different cultures and like to dress up in a style that matches the meals they make.
: An effeminate math teacher at AGHS who displays romantic feelings for Kouhei Hayami.
: A former soccer player turned hope bringer wizard who can transform into . First appearing in the film Kamen Rider Fourze the Movie: Space, Here We Come!, he helps Gentaro Kisaragi and Ryusei Sakuta defeat the Horoscope simulacra so they can rejoin their friends in stopping the Kyodain. Following a cameo appearance in the series finale, Soma joins forces with Kisaragi and Sakuta once more to defeat the Akumaizer during the events of the crossover film Kamen Rider × Kamen Rider Wizard & Fourze: Movie War Ultimatum.

Spin-off exclusive characters

Nadeshiko Misaki
 is an alien lifeform called SOLU ("Seeds Of Life from the Universe") who mimicked her namesake's appearance, becomes an AGHS student, and makes her first appearance in the crossover film Kamen Rider × Kamen Rider Fourze & OOO: Movie War Mega Max. After seeing Gentaro Kisaragi transform into Kamen Rider Fourze, Misaki uses her alien powers to create her own Rider powers and transform into . However, she is kidnapped by Suddendath of Foundation X, who turns her into the SOLU Switch for Lem Kannagi. After Fourze joins forces with Kamen Rider OOO to defeat Kannagi, Misaki becomes a being of pure energy and leaves Earth.

During the events of the crossover film Kamen Rider × Kamen Rider Wizard & Fourze: Movie War Ultimatum, XVII brings Misaki back to Earth to help Fourze and Kamen Rider Wizard defeat the Akumaizer.

With the  belt and two copies of Fourze's Astroswitches, Misaki can transform into Kamen Rider Nadeshiko. While transformed, she can utilize half of Fourze's Astroswitches and use her alien powers to create copies or stronger versions of Fourze's equipment. Additionally, she can perform the  finisher on her own and the  finisher with Kamen Rider Fourze.

Foundation X

 is a mysterious research foundation that originally funded and researched the Museum's Gaia Memories before shifting their attention to other projects, such as funding Mitsuaki Gamou's work with Cosmic Energy and Zodiarts Switches.

Lem Kannagi
 is a mysterious Foundation X agent who appears exclusively in the crossover film Kamen Rider × Kamen Rider Fourze & OOO: Movie War Mega Max. Upon gathering the necessary materials, he goes rogue, transforms into the monstrous , and attempts to take over the world. However, he is defeated by Kamen Riders Fourze and OOO, who destroy him along with the Exodus.

On his own, Kannagi can utilize his breath as a repelling or attracting force and dissolve unprotected humans. While transformed, he possesses chronokinesis, a hover pack, and the ability to convert his cape into a boomerang-shaped sword.

Katal
 is one of Lem Kannagi's subordinates who can transform into a draconic Mutamit called  and appears exclusively in the crossover film Kamen Rider × Kamen Rider Fourze & OOO: Movie War Mega Max. While helping Kannagi achieve his goals, Katal fights Kamen Rider Fourze and the Kamen Rider Club before the former kills him.

Solaris
 is one of Lem Kannagi's subordinates who was transformed into a Mutamit, possesses a Zodiarts Switch that allows her to transform into a copy of the Unicorn Zodiarts, and appears exclusively in the crossover film Kamen Rider × Kamen Rider Fourze & OOO: Movie War Mega Max. While helping Kannagi achieve his goals, she is defeated by Kamen Rider W.

Kiima
 is the superior of Lem Kannagi, who kills her after his plan to take over the world is exposed and he goes rogue.

Kyodain
The  are two of three  that Professor Blink created and infused with Cosmic Energy who first appear in the film Kamen Rider Fourze the Movie: Space, Here We Come! After attaining sentience and developing elitist personalities, they killed Blink and attempted to attack humanity, only for Blink and XVII to lock them in human forms and trap them on Earth. Despite this, the Kyodain utilize their human forms to create the front organization  and manipulate the Kamen Rider Club into helping them regain their full capabilities, only to be destroyed by Kamen Rider Fourze.

In the crossover film Kamen Rider × Super Sentai × Space Sheriff: Super Hero Taisen Z, new versions of the Kyodain join Space Shocker. However, their sense of honor and desire to fight Gavan lead to the pair being destroyed by Space Ikadevil for acting against Space Shocker's cause.

Groundain

Skydain

XVII
 is a large satellite with the personality of Professor Blink capable of communicating with humans via the  global computer terminal who first appears in the film Kamen Rider Fourze the Movie: Space, Here We Come!. After the Kyodain fatally injured Blink, XVII trapped the androids in human forms and sent them to Earth years prior. With help from Kamen Rider Fourze and the Kamen Rider Club, XVII combats the Kyodain when they resurface in the present before befriending Fourze and leaving to journey through space. In the crossover film, Kamen Rider × Kamen Rider Wizard & Fourze: Movie War Ultimatum, XVII brings Nadeshiko Misaki back to Earth so she can aid Fourze and Kamen Rider Wizard in their fight against the Akumaizer.

Alicia Federation
The  is a mysterious organization that appear exclusively in the film Kamen Rider Fourze the Movie: Space, Here We Come!.

Professor Blink
 is an Alicia Federation scientist who created the Kyodain, who killed him after attaining sentience.

Inga Blink
 is an Alicia Federation agent, a practitioner of the Seishin Dairin Fist, and daughter of Professor Blink partnered with Black Knight. In the film Kamen Rider Fourze the Movie: Space, Here We Come!, she attempts to stop the Kamen Rider Club upon discovering they are unknowingly aiding the Kyodain before joining forces with the club to defeat the androids. Five years later, as of the events of the film Kamen Rider × Kamen Rider Wizard & Fourze: Movie War Ultimatum, Inga has joined Interpol and became Ryusei Sakuta's partner.

Black Knight
 is the third Machine Organism that Professor Blink created whose mental capacity, unlike the Kyodain, developed more slowly. As a result, Black Knight became a loyal member of the Alicia Federation partnered with Inga Blink. While helping her and the Kamen Rider Club stop the Kyodain in the present, Black Knight sacrifices itself to protect them.

In battle, Black Knight possesses armor that increases its defensive capabilities and wields the  rapier and a machine gun built into his chest.

Miyoko Ohki
, nicknamed , is a student at Amanogawa High and only member of the Space Kamen Rider Club who appears exclusively in the film Kamen Rider × Kamen Rider Wizard & Fourze: Movie War Ultimatum.

Monster League

Saburo Kazeta
 is the leader of the Monster League whose psychic powers initially allow him to transform into a pupa-like mutant called  and makes his first appearance in the film Kamen Rider × Kamen Rider Wizard & Fourze: Movie War Ultimatum. Upon learning his mistake and receiving help from his teacher Gentaro Kisaragi, Kazeta finds the will to fight for justice and transforms into a blue moth-like mutant called  to defeat Banba. Vowing to protect his fellow AGHS students, Kazeta reworks the Monster League into the Youth League. During the events of the film Kamen Rider × Super Sentai × Space Sheriff: Super Hero Taisen Z, a time distortion temporarily brings Kazeta to 2013, allowing him to join a past version of Kisaragi in fighting Space Shocker.

As Sanagiman, Kazeta possesses durable armor-like skin and superhuman strength.

Rumi Komaki
 is a member of the Monster League nicknamed .

Daita Kondo
 is a member of the Monster League nicknamed .

Chikao Nezu
 is a member of the Monster League nicknamed .

Kageto Banba
He was previously involved in Mitsuaki Gamou's studies into Cosmic Energy before leaving in order to devote himself to the study of his psychic powers instead. Banba intends to use the Monster League in pursuit of his goals, but is defeated by Saburo Kazeta and arrested by Ryusei Sakuta, who destroys his Zodiarts Switch. Despite this, Banba is able to energize the Zeber and hand it off to the Akumaizer for their plans.

As the Hercules Zodiarts, Banba can conjure Dustards, possesses superhuman strength, and is armed with the  club.

Tsubasa
 is a SOLU organism that split off from Nadeshiko Misaki and appears exclusively in the tie-in novel Kamen Rider Fourze: Ama High Grad-Uation. During Kamen Riders Fourze and Nadeshiko's fight with Kuniteru Emoto as the Virgo Zodiarts during the events of the film Kamen Rider × Kamen Rider Fourze & OOO: Movie War Mega Max, Tsubasa split off from Nadeshiko and secretly attached himself to Emoto. When Emoto traveled to the M-BUS to maintain his Tachibana identity, Tsubasa found the people that Emoto kept in suspended animation, including Sarina Sonoda. Tsubasa mimicked her appearance and took on a repressed split personality that she had developed based on her childhood friend , who was killed in an accident following an argument they had.

Following Emoto and Mitsuaki Gamou's deaths, Fourze transports the people on the M-BUS back to Earth and unknowingly brings Tsubasa with him. Upon arriving, Tsubasa utilizes the "memory of the Kamen Riders" and technology based on the Fourze and Meteor Drivers to create his own Rider system and become , naming himself after a Japanese experimental rocket of the same name that Sonoda dreamed of riding. Tsubasa also turns Hiroki Makise back into the Pyxis Zodiarts and creates the Carina, Puppis, and Vela Zodiarts from problem AGHS students to gather energy from their despair before fusing the four Zodiarts into the Argo Zodiarts. After absorbing Sonoda and Yuki Jojima's dreams, Tsubasa transforms into  and overwhelms Fourze until the latter brings the alien to space and defeats him, turning Tsubasa back into his SOLU form. Before returning to space, Tsubasa expresses a desire to befriend Fourze upon his return.

Notes

References

Fourze characters

Kamen Rider Fourze
Kamen Rider Fourze